Barbara Nadalin (22 December 1972, in San Vito al Tagliamento – 14 July 2012, in Udine) was an Italian slalom canoeist who competed from the late 1980s to the early 2000s.

She won a bronze medal in the K1 team event at the 1996 European Championships in Augsburg. Nadalin finished 15th in the K1 event at the 1996 Summer Olympics in Atlanta.

World Cup individual podiums

References

Sports-Reference.com profile

1972 births
2012 deaths
Canoeists at the 1996 Summer Olympics
Italian female canoeists
Olympic canoeists of Italy
People from San Vito al Tagliamento
Sportspeople from Friuli-Venezia Giulia